Lars Lukas Mai (born 31 March 2000) is a German professional footballer who plays as a centre-back for Swiss Super League club Lugano. He has represented Germany at various youth levels internationally.

Club career
Lars Lukas Mai, nicknamed Lasse, joined the youth sector of Bayern Munich in July 2014 coming from Dynamo Dresden.

On 21 April 2018, Mai debuted under the coach Jupp Heynckes in the 3–0 away win at Hannover 96. He played the full 90 minutes to become the first player born in the year 2000 to play for Bayern Munich in the Bundesliga.

On 27 April 2018, Mai signed his first professional contract, signing a three-year deal lasting until 30 June 2021.

On 21 July 2020, Mai signed a contract extension and was loaned out to Darmstadt for the 2020–21 season.

He joined Werder Bremen on loan for the 2021–22 season in July 2021.

On 18 June 2022, Mai moved to Swiss Super League club Lugano on a three-year deal until 2025.

Personal life
His father Lars was a member of the Supervisory Board of Dynamo Dresden from November 2013 to September 2017. His older brother Sebastian is also a footballer.

Career statistics

Club

Honours
Bayern Munich II
 Regionalliga Bayern: 2018–19
 Premier League International Cup: 2018–19

Bayern Munich
 Bundesliga: 2017–18, 2018–19, 2019–20
 DFB-Pokal: 2018–19, 2019–20

Individual
 Fritz Walter Medal U17 Bronze: 2017

References

External links
 
 

2000 births
Living people
Footballers from Dresden
German footballers
Association football central defenders
Germany youth international footballers
Germany under-21 international footballers
Bundesliga players
2. Bundesliga players
3. Liga players
Regionalliga players
FC Bayern Munich II players
FC Bayern Munich footballers
SV Werder Bremen players
SV Darmstadt 98 players
FC Lugano players
German expatriate footballers
German expatriate sportspeople in Switzerland
Expatriate footballers in Switzerland